Gan Ner is a community settlement in northern Israel. Located near the Green Line to the south of Afula, it falls under the jurisdiction of Gilboa Regional Council.

History
The village was founded in 1987 by a group of families from nearby moshavim,  on the land of the depopulated Palestinian village of Al-Mazar. 

Gan Ner  was named for Lord Barnett Janner. In 1995 a new neighborhood was constructed in the community.

Home to the Hapoel Gilboa Galil basketball club which was formed in 2008, the village has a 2,057-seat sports arena.

References

Community settlements
Populated places established in 1987
1987 establishments in Israel
Populated places in Northern District (Israel)